The Vágatunnilin (Vágar Tunnel) is a  long undersea road tunnel in the Faroe Islands. It goes under Vestmannasund strait and connects the two islands of Streymoy and Vágar. The tunnel was the first sub-sea tunnel in the Faroe Islands, and connects the capital of Tórshavn on Streymoy with Vágar Airport on Vágar.

History

Surveyor drills were executed in 1988, and construction was planned to start in 1989. However, due to the onset of the economic crisis, almost all infrastructural projects were suspended, including the Vágatunnilin. Only the construction of Gamlarætt, a new ferry port to Sandoy,  continued. After the false start, the second attempt for construction started on 28 September 2000. The opening for public traffic was 10 December 2002. Traffic has steadily increased from 359,440 vehicles in 2003 to 952,300 in 2019 (2,609 per day).

Before the opening date there was a ferry across the Vestmannasund between Vestmanna and Oyrargjógv operated by Strandfaraskip Landsins. Both ferry docks are now in disuse.

Characteristics
There is a road toll which is used to pay the maintenance for the tunnel construction. The investment of 240 million Danish kroner was paid back at 10 December 2016, exactly 14 years after opening.

See also
List of tunnels of the Faroe Islands

References

External links
The tunnel toll company (English)

Tunnels in the Faroe Islands
Undersea tunnels in Europe
Tunnels completed in 2002
2002 establishments in the Faroe Islands
Road tunnels